Spanish Oran was a territory of the Spanish Empire as a result of the Conquest of Oran.

History 
The conquest was carried out by the Spanish Empire on the Algerian Kingdom of Tlemcen. The expedition was carried out 80 naos and 10 galleys which carried about 8,000-12,000 infantry men and 3,000-4,000 cavalry men.

The territory was lost to Bey Mustapha Bin Youssef who took advantage of the War of Spanish Succession, to besiege the city in 1707. The city fell in 1708.

In 1732, Spanish forces recaptured Oran under José Carrilo de Albornoz and maintained control for the next six decades.

In 1790, forces of the Deylik of Algeria under Mohamed el-Kebir took advantage of an earthquake and besieged the city once again. In 1792 the Spanish troops retreated from the city ending Spanish rule over the city.

The town stayed under Algerian control until 1831, when it was conquered by the Kingdom of France.

References 
1509 establishments in the Spanish Empire
 
16th century in the Spanish Empire
States and territories established in 1509
States and territories disestablished in 1792